Henny Moan (born 22 February 1936) is a Norwegian actress from Finnmark. She has had a long career in theatre, but is best known for her roles in certain classics of Norwegian cinema, such as the Oscar-nominated Nine Lives (1957) and Lake of the Dead (1958). Moan was married to the author André Bjerke for a period.

Biography
At the age of 17 she left her home in Finnmarkwhere she worked at a gas stationwithout telling anyone where she was going. She moved to Oslo where she applied to Teaterhøyskolen (the Theater Academy). Here she was accepted in the first intake in the history of the school, in 1953.

Moan has always been characterised by her short-cropped hair, a style she came up with in 1954, at a time when this was still quite uncommon for girls. She claims she originally did it because it was convenient, and because she had worn her hair like that as a child, to avoid lice and to make the hair grow out thicker.

From 1959 to 1972 Moan was married to celebrated Norwegian author André Bjerke. With Bjerke she had the daughter Vilde in 1960, who later wrote a book about her childhood. Henny and André lived together until their daughter was nine, at which point they separated.

Career

Moan has acted both at Det Norske Teatret (the Norwegian Theater), Oslo Nye Teater and at Nationaltheatret (the National Theatre), in roles such as "Marguerite" in Dumas's The Lady of the Camellias, and "Miss Julie" in Strindbergs play by that name. In 2006 she won the award "Aase Byes ærespris" for her effort in Ibsen-roles. She played her last part before retirement early in 2007. After retiring she started working on her autobiography.

She is also known for her work in movies, and had a role in the Oscar-nominated Nine Lives in 1957. This film was in 2005 named the best movie in the history of Norwegian film, by a jury of movie critics. After this she received offers from Hollywood, but decided to stay in Norway. While married to Bjerke, she took part in the adaptation of his novel Lake of the Dead. Here she appeared in what was to become an iconic scene of Norwegian cinema, where she walks in a white, translucent dress along a tarn in the forest. More recently she had a brief part in Bent Hamer's critically acclaimed O' Horten.

On television she is known from the science-fiction series "Blindpassasjer" (1978), written by Tor Åge Bringsværd and Jon Bing. Before this she played the part of "Edvarda" in a 1973 TV-series based on Knut Hamsun's novels Benoni and Rosa. Moan also worked with television drama for several years.

Select filmography

References

External links

1936 births
Living people
People from Alta, Norway
Norwegian stage actresses
Norwegian film actresses
Norwegian television actresses
21st-century Norwegian actresses
20th-century Norwegian actresses